Vicky Shell (born June 14, 1967) is a Dominican singer, educator, songwriter, who is best known for being the first Dominican who has set the precedent for being the first female salsa singer in the Dominican Republic with a full production of Salsa Latin Jazz.  She is known as a multifaceted artist of Latin tropical rhythms in addition to other styles of music.

Career 
Vicky Shell this versatile singer, educator, and songwriter started early in her life with local bands and as time went on she went solo leading her own band. Independently she recorded her first album. In 1988 she pursued her musical studies in the Bronx Community College, where she took various credits in music. She had continued her studies in the university of City college of New York City and graduated with a Bachelor of Science in Education.

Through the times she became a school teacher in New York City schools and Yonkers public schools, since she had already completed one of her life goals which were being an educator. She eventually decided to follow her heart and continues striving towards her other passion which is music. With the music industry being one of the most difficult industries to exceed in she took on the challenge and recorded her second tropical album on her own in which it was well received into the world.

Vicky Shell released her album Salsa Con Pimienta! She has been acknowledged for her magnificent elucidation of the renowned songs such as "Como Una Sombra", "Mueva Las Maracas", "Hombre de Hierro", and "Musica Latina". In which these songs follow the genre styles of rhumba, Latin jazz, bolero son, salsa romantica, and Descarga. Music producer Oscar-nominated and Grammy award winner Ray Santos arranged and collaborated, as well From Fania All-Stars Héctor Bomberito-Zarzuela trumpet player contribute on several of the song of this album Vicky Shell Salsa con Pimienta!

During the many years of singing Latin contemporary rhythms Vicky Shell have come with her full salsa production enabler the title "The Pioneer Lady of The Salsa Dominicana", because of her full broad spectrum in the development of salsa movement as a female during the time when other Latin rhythms were dominating the music industry in the Dominican Republic. Her appearance to the public with her live band playing her maracas who dares to do anything to innovate has unfolded a great scenic dominion, bringing back to consciousness of the spectacular use of non-common resources.

Vicky Shell Tropicalisima album is a contemporary tropical genre style this album has known for these rhythmic hot tracks such as "Te Esperaré", "La Ladrona", "El Morenito", "Quédate", and "Meneito". In this album music composer Ramón Orlando arranged and collaborated some of the songs. Even though she is known for singing salsa it has been her enjoyment to sing in merengue
tropical because it is the predominated genre in Dominican Republic.

Vicky Shell Olé is the name of the single "Guaguanco Español" composed by Tite Curet Alonso; one of the premier salsa songwriters of all time. The song Guaguanco Español has never been recorded before, since 1979, arranged by Dionis Fernandez 30 years ago. The singer to whom the composition was dedicated did not record it and got flabbergasted by the way Vicky interpreted the style of genres and offered it to her. Vicky took the offer and produced it with a modern twist consisting flamenco and guaguanco salsa styles. In 2012 Vicky Shell released this as a single written for the country of Spain. "Guaguanco Espanol" is a tropical flamenco alternative style. Although absent from the music industry for some time, Vicky Shell returns in 2017 with the music video for the single "La Musica Latina" in representation of all Latin Countries. Vicky Shell Caribbean Album is a medley of tropical caribbean songs released in 2017–2018. El Nazareno is a single cover song recorded in 2019 with modern essences that include Reggaeton and modern instrumental cadences that does not depart from the original identity of the original recording with the legendary improvising lead Salsa singer Ismael Rivera. In a radio interview, Vicky Shell mentioned that she had always wanted to record a Salsa song to show Jesus Christ's great relevance.

Early life 
Vicky Shell was born in the Dominican Republic in 1967; with the name Belkis Arias known by her artist stage name Vicky Shell. Came to the United States at the age of 9 and resided since then she was raised in an environment where Latin rhythms were well received. This atmosphere influences her appreciation for the arts.  Notwithstanding her many hardships such as unstable homes as a child her forte still prevailed.  She is an inspiration to many of us who have had the urge to surrender to adversity. She started her vocal career with local groups and continued directing her own orchestra. With her orchestra Vicky Shell who has shared a stage with renowned artists and has been – in numerous places around the world.

Discography

References

External links 
 Official website
 Facebook
 YouTube

1967 births
Living people
Women pop singers
Dominican Republic songwriters
People from Santo Domingo
Bronx Community College alumni